Convective momentum transport usually describes a vertical flux of the momentum of horizontal winds or currents. That momentum is carried like a non-conserved flow tracer by vertical air motions in convection.

In the atmosphere, convective momentum transport by small but vigorous (cumulus type) cloudy updrafts can be understood as an interplay of three main mechanisms:

Vertical advection of ambient momentum due to subsidence of environmental air that compensates the in-cloud upward mass flux,
Detrainment of in-cloud momentum where updrafts stop ascending,
Accelerations by the pressure gradient force around clouds whose inner momentum differs from their environment.

The net effect of these interacting mechanisms depends on the detailed configuration or 'organization' of the convective cloud or storm system.

See also
 momentum
 vertical motion

References

Tropical meteorology
Continuum mechanics